Liolaemus puritamensis is a species of lizard in the family Iguanidae.  It is found in Argentina and Chile.

References

puritamensis
Lizards of South America
Reptiles of Argentina
Reptiles of Chile
Reptiles described in 1989